The 1988 United States presidential election in Kentucky took place on November 8, 1988. All 50 states and the District of Columbia, were part of the 1988 United States presidential election. Kentucky voters chose nine electors to the Electoral College, which selected the president and vice president. Kentucky was won by incumbent United States Vice President George H. W. Bush of Texas, who was running against Massachusetts Governor Michael Dukakis. Bush ran with Indiana Senator Dan Quayle as Vice President, and Dukakis ran with Texas Senator Lloyd Bentsen.

Kentucky weighed in for this election as 4 points more Republican than the national average. , this is the last time that Jefferson County voted for a Republican presidential candidate, as well as the last time that Kentucky has voted more Democratic than neighboring Tennessee. 

The presidential election of 1988 was a very partisan election for Kentucky, with more than 99 percent of the electorate voting for either the Democratic or Republican parties, and only five parties appearing on the ballot. The vast majority of counties turned out for Bush, including the highly populated center of Louisville's Jefferson County, the last time that county voted for the Republican candidate. Conversely, several small clumps of counties in the Eastern Coal Field (surrounding Pike County) and in the Jackson Purchase (surrounding McCracken County) regions of the state voted primarily Democratic.

Bush won the election in Kentucky by a solid 11-point margin. While Kentucky typically votes conservative, the election results in Kentucky are also reflective of a nationwide reconsolidation of the base for the Republican Party, which took place through the 1980s. Through the passage of some very controversial economic programs, spearheaded by then President Ronald Reagan (called, collectively, "Reaganomics"), the mid-to-late 1980s saw a period of economic growth and stability. The hallmark for Reaganomics was, in part, the wide-scale deregulation of corporate interests, and tax cuts for the wealthy.

Dukakis ran on a socially liberal platform, and advocated for higher economic regulation and environmental protection. Bush, alternatively, ran on a campaign of continuing the social and economic policies of former President Reagan - which gained him much support with social conservatives and people living in rural areas. Additionally, while the economic programs passed under Reagan, and furthered under Bush and Clinton, may have boosted the economy for a brief period, they are criticized by many analysts as "setting the stage" for economic troubles in the United States after 2007, such as the Great Recession.

Results

Results by county

See also
 Presidency of George H. W. Bush

References

Kentucky
1988
1988 Kentucky elections